Vikram Sood is the former head of India's foreign intelligence agency, the Research and Analysis Wing (R&AW), and an advisor to the Observer Research Foundation, an independent public policy think tank in New Delhi. Sood was an officer of the Indian Postal Service (IPoS) before he joined the intelligence organisation R&AW and later served as its spymaster from 2000 to 2003. He retired as a career intelligence officer with 31 years of service on 31 March 2003.

He was trained under the mentorship of B. Raman and interviewed by R&AW's founding secretary R.N. Kao during induction. He is the author of the book The Unending Game: A Former R&AW Chief's Insights into Espionage published in 2018, which according to Sood is not a memoir but a beginner's guide to intelligence and espionage.

Academic Education
Sood did his M.A. in Economics from St. Stephen's College, Delhi.

Career
Sood was an officer of the Indian Postal Service (IPoS), a part of India's civil services, and was moved into the Research and Analysis Service (RAS) cadre in 1966. In a personal tribute in Rediff, Sood says his mentor was B. Raman, one of the founders of R&AW. He became familiar with Raman in 1972, when he was assigned to understudy his role and later to take over from him until 1974. Sood was asked to take over charge from Raman once again in 1983, and on a final occasion on Raman's retirement in 1994.

Sood's appointment was different from others, as he became a R&AW chief without having served as a police officer. Sood had replaced S Sunderrajan who was an Indian Police Service (IPS) officer of the Delhi cadre.  Sood served as the head of R&AW from 2000 to 2003 during the period when Atal Bihari Vajpayee was the Prime Minister of India. He retired as a career intelligence officer with 31 years of service on 31 March 2003. As the chief of R&AW he was the designated Secretary (R) and also the director general of security.

As of 2019, Sood has been acting as an advisor to the Observer Research Foundation, an independent public policy think tank in New Delhi. He writes regularly on national security, foreign relations and strategic issues.

Views

Pakistan
At the event for his book launch, The Unending Game, Sood said that the Pakistan Army is the "largest corporate entity in Pakistan" and that Kashmir is being used by the Pakistan Army merely as a justification to maintain power in Pakistan. Sood takes a hardline stance, saying that Pakistan would need to "shut the machinery of terrorism" and provide proof that changes are happening for dialogue to happen. In 2016 he had voiced similar  opinions, stating that dialogue with Pakistan is pointless and that unless Pakistan changes its approach, dialogue between the two countries should not happen.

In relation to Kulbhushan Jadhav, an Indian national who is in Pakistan's custody since March 2016 and is being tried by a military court on alleged charges of being a R&AW agent, Sood says that Pakistan has no "leverage" over India because of this matter. In an interview in 2019 he stated, "No spy worth his salt will be caught with his passport. The charges against him are laughable."

China
When it comes to China-Pakistan links, Sood is of the opinion that China takes actions such as supporting Pakistan in the UNSC in relation to Masood Azhar because of fear of retaliation from Islamic groups in Xinjiang (an autonomous region in China which partly borders Pakistan) other than of course protecting their interests in Gilgit-Baltistan and Balochistan in relation to CPEC. When it comes to just China, Sood says that the capabilities of China are much more than Pakistan and that India should take note. This statement was made during a seminar on 17 February 2019, three days after the Pulwama attack, where he had also said, "China in control of Pakistan is even worse."

Publications

In 2018 Sood wrote, The Unending Game: A Former R&AW Chief's Insights into Espionage, published by Penguin Viking. According to Sood, his book is not a memoir but a beginner's guide to espionage, a reference manual on intelligence. The book, which is divided into three concept related sections that are titled as "Tradecraft", "Inside Intelligence" and "What Lies Ahead", covers espionage during the two world wars, secret societies, psychological warfare in India, KGB and CIA interference in Indian politics, Pakistan and ISI, as well as intelligence failures in the world such as the 9/11 attacks and the 26/11 attacks among other things. Vappala Balachandran reviewed the book, writing that it is "a low-profile but solid contribution".

References

External links

Vikram Sood's blog

Living people
People of the Research and Analysis Wing
Indian civil servants
Year of birth missing (living people)